"Ping" is a short story written by Samuel Beckett in French (originally "Bing") in 1966.  It was later translated into English by Beckett and published in 1967. 

David Lodge has described it as: "the rendering of the consciousness of a person confined in a small, bare, white room, a person who is evidently under extreme duress, and probably at the last gasp of life."

Notes

1966 short stories
Short stories by Samuel Beckett